Hobbs Coast is that portion of the coast of Marie Byrd Land, Antarctica extending from Cape Burks to a point on the coast opposite eastern Dean Island, at , or between the Ruppert Coast in the west and the Bakutis Coast in the east. It stretches from 136°50′W to 127°35′. The coast was discovered by the US Antarctic Service (1939–1941) and named for Professor William H. Hobbs of the University of Michigan, a glaciologist specializing in polar geography and history. The United States Geological Survey completely mapped the coast from ground surveys and U.S. Navy air photos, 1959–1965.

References

Coasts of Antarctica
Landforms of Marie Byrd Land